Daan Bovenberg (born 25 October 1988) is a Dutch former professional footballer who played as a right back.

Career
Bovenberg started his career with Excelsior. After playing a year and a half for FC Utrecht for which he played only 17 matches, Bovenberg left to NEC in January 2013. After losing prospect of playing for NEC, Bovenberg dissolved his contract with the Eredivisie side on 31 January 2014. He returned in professional football in June 2014, as he signed with his former team Excelsior, which had been promoted to the Eredivisie. On 25 May 2016, Bovenberg announced his retirement from professional football, as he had the ambition to develop a career outside of football.

References

1988 births
Living people
Dutch footballers
Footballers from Rotterdam
Excelsior Rotterdam players
FC Utrecht players
NEC Nijmegen players
Eredivisie players
Eerste Divisie players
Association football defenders